Chanditala  is a town in Chanditala II community development block of Srirampore subdivision in Hooghly District in the Indian state of West Bengal.

Geography

Location

Police station
Chanditala police station has jurisdiction over the Chanditala I CD Block and a part of Chanditala II CD Block.

CD Block HQ
The headquarters of Chanditala II CD Block are located at Chanditala.

Urbanisation
Srirampore subdivision is the most urbanized of the subdivisions in Hooghly district. 73.13% of the population in the subdivision is urban and 26.88% is rural. The subdivision has 6 municipalities and 34 census towns. The municipalities are: Uttarpara Kotrung Municipality, Konnagar Municipality, Serampore Municipality, Baidyabati Municipality, Rishra Municipality and Dankuni Municipality. Amongst the CD Blocks in the subdivision, Uttarapara Serampore (census towns shown in a separate map) had 76% urban population, Chanditala I 42%, Chanditala II 69% and Jangipara 7% (census towns shown in the map above). All places marked in the map are linked in the larger full screen map.

Gram panchayat
Villages and census towns in Chanditala gram panchayat are: Bamandanga, Benipur, Chanditala, Kalachhara and Pairagachha.

Demographics
As per the 2011 Census of India, Chanditala had a total population of 3,984 of which 2,059 (52%) were males and 1,925 (48%) were females. Population below 6 years was 335. The total number of literates in Chanditala was 3,119 (85.48% of the population over 6 years).

Transport
 Railway
The nearest railway station is Gobra railway station on Howrah-Bardhaman chord of Kolkata Suburban Railway network. Had a Railway Station from 1915–1971 under Narrow Gauge Railway. Railway Station Board can be still seen beside SH 15 as the highway follows the same path & route of the erstwhile Martin's Light Railways Sheakhala line.   
 Road

The main road is SH 15 (Ahilyabai Holkar Road). It is the main artery of the village and it is connected to NH 19 (old number NH 2).
 Bus

Private Bus 
 26 Bonhooghly - Champadanga
 26A Serampore - Aushbati
 26C Bonhooghly - Jagatballavpur
 57A Howrah Station - Chanditala
 E36 Esplanade - Champadanga
 26B Howrah Station - Bandar (Dhanyaghori)
 26/1 Dakshineswar - Bhagabatipur
 4/41 Chinsurah - Chanditala

Healthcare
Chanditala Rural Hospital has 30 beds.

References

Villages in Chanditala II CD Block